Plumier is a surname. Notable people with the surname include:

 Charles Plumier (1646–1704), French botanist
 Jean Plumier (1909–?), Belgian fencer

See also
 Plumer